Aghstafa Airport  is an airport serving the city of Aghstafa in Azerbaijan.

References

Airports in Azerbaijan